Wang Yuanyuan (born 14 July 1997) is a Chinese volleyball player.

She participated at the 2018 FIVB Volleyball Women's Nations League, and 2019 Montreux Volley Masters.

Clubs 
  Tianjin (2016–present)

References

External links 
 FIVB profile

1997 births
Living people
Sportspeople from Gansu
People from Lanzhou
Chinese women's volleyball players
Middle blockers
Volleyball players at the 2020 Summer Olympics
Olympic volleyball players of China
21st-century Chinese women